The 1984 United States House of Representatives elections in Nevada were held on November 6, 1984, to determine who would represent Nevada in the United States House of Representatives. Nevada had two seats in the House, apportioned according to the 1980 United States Census. Representatives are elected for two-year terms.

Overview

District 1

District 2

See also

 1984 United States House of Representatives elections

References

Nevada
1984
United States House of Representatives